The Devotchkas are a four-piece American street punk band from New York, New York, United States. Their name was derived from the popular film and novel A Clockwork Orange. Devotchka in Nadsat means "girl", which is itself derived from the Russian word (девочка) of the same meaning.

An all-girl group, the band was formed by three friends in 1996. The early period saw drummers come and go, including Jon from The Krays. Wanting a permanent drummer, they eventually recruited Gabrielle in 1999 to complete the line-up.

In 1998, they were signed to Punk Core Records for the release of their debut EP, which sold in excess of 5,000 copies, a surprisingly high number for a band's debut EP, especially on vinyl format. In 2000, Punkcore released The Devotchkas second 7" EP and an extended version CD, both named "Annihilation". Following their six-week-long 2001 European tour to support the release of "Annihilation", singer Stephanie exited the band. The role of vocalist was then filled by JJ, who sang on their 2002 album Live Fast, Die Young. For a very brief period, the band toyed with the idea of changing their name to The 99s, however this was a fleeting idea which they quickly recanted and they continued forward as The Devotchkas. In support of their 2002 release, the Devotchkas went on a successful European tour in the summer of 2002. Shortly thereafter, the band members decided to part ways for a long hiatus. In January 2022, the Devotchkas announced a reunion show at CY Fest in Los Angeles, California for September 2022, featuring the same line-up from the band's Live Fast Die Young album, in celebration of the 20-year anniversary of the album. 
A limited color flexi entitled “From The Vault” was released for the festival, featuring two tracks - “My Scars” and a previously unreleased version of “Wicked Heart”. It is currently the only official new release by the band. 

After the band’s incredibly welcome reception at the festival and it’s pre-show, the band was invited to play again at CY Fest for 2023, and also announced their addition to 2023’s Rebellion Festival in Blackpool. 

The Devotchkas also announced they no longer are associated with previous singer Stephanie in any way, and remain with JJ as the permanent vocalist for the band. In addition, the band performed several new songs at CY Fest and it’s pre-show, with intent to release them on an all-new album in 2023, as well as a possible 20th-anniversary special edition repressing of “Live Fast, Die Young”.

Line ups

The Devotchkas
JJ – vocals
Mande – guitar
Alaine – bass
Gabrielle – drums

The Devotchkas (1999-2001)
Stephanie – vocals
Mande – guitar
Alaine – bass
Gabrielle – drums

Early Devotchkas line up
Steph - vocals
Mande - guitar
Alaine - bass
Jon - drums

Discography
OiToy - 1998
Devotchkas EP - 1998 Punk Core Records
Annihilation - 2000 Punk Core Records
Live Fast, Die Young - 2001 Punk Core Records
From The Vault - 2022 Dig My Grave Records

References

The Devotchkas official website

All-female punk bands
Punk rock groups from New York (state)
Street punk groups
Musical groups established in 2006
People from Long Island
Musical quartets
Women in New York (state)